Stanislav Shtanenko (born 5 February 1996 in Ukraine) is a Ukrainian footballer who last played for Niva in his home country.

Career
Shtanenko started his senior career with Karpaty Lviv. In 2016, he signed for NK Zavrč in the Slovenian PrvaLiga, where he made four appearances and scored zero goals. After that, he played for Zirka Kropyvnytskyi, Unia Turza Śląska, Skala Stryi, Podillya Khmelnytskyi, Sluch, and Niva.

References

External links 
 Stanislav Shtanenko: "We came from Ukraine, and we are constantly told - "easier, easier" 
 Stanislav Shtanenko: now they do all the necessary documents for me, after which I can enter the field as part of Zavrcha
 U-21 Karpaty player Stanislav Shtanenko: We have enough strength to move the whole game

Ukrainian footballers
1996 births
Living people
NK Zavrč players
FC Skala Stryi (1911) players
FC Podillya Khmelnytskyi players
Association football defenders